Jorge Azanza Soto (born 16 June 1982 in Alsasua, Navarre) is a Spanish professional road bicycle racer. He last competed for the UCI ProTour team .

In 2004, Azanza won his first and still only races, when he finished first in the overall rankings of the Vuelta a Córdoba. He also won Part A of the third stage in the Bidasoa Itzulia in that same year. In 2007 he made his Tour de France debut.

Career achievements

Major results

2004
1st Overall Vuelta a Cordoba
1st Stage 3a Bidasoa Itzulia
2005
9th Overall Vuelta a La Rioja
2006
6th Trofeo Magaluf-Palmanova

Grand Tour general classification results timeline

References

External links 

1982 births
Living people
Cyclists from Navarre
People from Barranca (comarca)